Peschanokopsky (masculine), Peschanokopskaya (feminine), or Peschanokopskoye (neuter) may refer to:
Peschanokopsky District, a district of Rostov Oblast, Russia
Peschanokopskoye, a rural locality (a selo) in Rostov Oblast, Russia